Charles Douglas Symons, CB, MC (13 October 1885 – 15 October 1949) was an Anglican priest.

Early life and education
He was born on 13 October 1885 and was educated at Kelly College, now known as Mount Kelly, Tavistock and Trinity College, Cambridge. He graduated from the University of Cambridge with a second class Bachelor of Arts (BA) degree; as per tradition, this was later promoted to a Master of Arts (MA (Cantab)) degree. He awarded a Lambeth Doctor of Divinity (DD) degree in 1939.

Ordained ministry
Symons was ordained a deacon in 1908. His first post was as chaplain to Queen Elizabeth's Grammar School in Cranbrook, Kent. He was ordained a priest by Randall Davidson, the Archbishop of Canterbury, on Trinity Sunday 1911. He undertook two curacies; at Biddenden and at Walmer in the Diocese of Canterbury.

Symons served in the ranks of the Royal Army Medical Corps from 1915 to 1916. He served with the Royal Army Chaplains Department from 1916 to 1944. From 1939 to 1944, he served as Chaplain-General to the Forces.

An Honorary Chaplain to the King and a Chaplain of the Order of St John of Jerusalem, he died on 15 October 1949.

References

	

1885 births
People educated at Kelly College
Alumni of Trinity College, Cambridge
20th-century English Anglican priests
Recipients of the Military Cross
Chaplains General to the Forces
Companions of the Order of the Bath
Honorary Chaplains to the King
1949 deaths
World War I chaplains
World War II chaplains
British Army personnel of World War I
British Army personnel of World War II
War Office personnel in World War II